The Hornbostel–Sachs system of musical instrument classification defines idiophones as all instruments in which sound is produced primarily by way of the instrument itself vibrating without the use of membranes or strings.

Idiophones (1)

Struck idiophones (11)
Idiophones set in motion by a percussion action: hitting, shaking, or scraping.  Also see Struck idiophone.

Directly struck idiophones (111)
111.1 Concussion Idiophones or clappers

111.11 Concussion sticks or sticks of clap
 Claves

111.12 Concussion plaques or plaque clappers
 Clapper
 Guban
 Paiban
 Hyoshigi
 Pak
 Slapstick

111.13 Concussion troughs or trough clappers
 Balingbing

111.14 Concussion vessels or vessel clappers
 Spoons

111.141 Castanets - Natural and hollowed-out vessel clappers
 Castanets
 Coconut shells
 Krap

111.142 Cymbals - Vessel clappers with manufactured rim
 Chap
 Ching
 Cymbals, in pairs
 Clash Cymbals in pairs

111.2 Percussion Idiophones

111.21 Percussion sticks or bars

111.211 Individual percussion sticks
 Dhantal
 Triangle

111.212 Sets of percussion sticks in a range of different pitches combined into one instrument. - All xylophones, as long  as their sounding components are not in two different planes.
 Balafon
 Gandingan a kayo
 Glasschord
 Glass Marimba
 Kulintang a kayo
 Luntang or kwintangan kayo
 Marimba
 Marimbaphone (also bowed)
 Pong lang
 Xylophone
 Xylorimba

111.22 Percussion plaques

111.221 Individual percussion plaques

111.222 Sets of percussion plaques
 Crotales
 Lithophone
 Metallophones
 Celesta
 Fangxiang
 Gangsa
 Gendér
 Glockenspiel
 Kulintang a tiniok (kulintang a putao, sarunay)
 Ranat ek lek
 Ranat thum lek
 Toy piano
 Ugal
 Vibraphone

111.23 Percussion tubes

111.231 Individual percussion tubes.
 Agung a tamlang
 Alimba
 Huari
 Huiringua
 Kagul
 Krin or Kolokolos
 Mondo
 Mukoko
 Slit drum
 Takuapu
 Teponaztli

111.232 Sets of percussion tubes.
 Jegog
 Tubular bells or chimes

111.24 Percussion vessels.
 Boungu
 Chuk
 Cymbals
 Crash cymbal
 Hi-hat cymbal
 Ride cymbal
 Splash cymbal
 Hang
 Kagul or tagutok
 Slit drums:
 Slit gong
 Steelpan or steel drum
 Tank drum
 Udu (also an aerophone)
 Wood block

111.241 Gongs - The vibration is strongest near the vertex.

111.241.1 Individual gongs.
Babendil

111.241.2 Sets of gongs.
 Agung or agong
 Bock-a-da-bock
 Gandingan
 Kulintang or kolintang
 Reyong

111.242 Bells - The vibration is weakest near the vertex.
 Bell tree

111.242.1 Individual bells

111.242.11 Resting bells whose opening faces upward. 
Cowbell

111.242.12 Hanging bells suspended from the apex.

111.242.121 Hanging bells without internal strikers.

111.242.122 Hanging bells with internal strikers.
Bell

111.242.2 Sets of bells or chimes.

111.242.21 Sets of resting bells whose opening faces upward.

111.242.22 Sets of hanging bells suspended from the apex.

111.242.221 Sets of hanging bells without internal strikers.

111.242.222 Sets of hanging bells with internal strikers.
 Carillon

Indirectly struck idiophones (112)

112.1 Shaken idiophones or rattles

112.11 Suspension rattles - Perforated idiophones are mounted together, and shaken to strike against each other.

112.111 Strung rattles - Rattling objects are strung in rows on a cord.
 Sleigh bells

112.112 Stick rattles - Rattling objects are strung on a bar or ring.
 Jingle bells

112.12 Frame rattles - Rattling objects are attached to a carrier against which they strike.
 Flexatone
 Tambourine  (the membrane attached to a number of these also makes them a membranophone)
 Vibraslap

112.121 Pendant rattles.

112.122 Sliding rattles.

112.13 Vessel rattles - Rattling objects enclosed in a vessel strike against each other or against the walls of the vessel, or usually against both.

 Hosho
 Maracas
 Rainstick

112.2 Scraped Idiophones
 Washboard

112.21 Scraped sticks.

112.211 Scraped sticks without resonator.

112.212 Scraped sticks with resonator.

112.22 Scraped tubes.
 Kagul

112.23 Scraped vessels.
 Güiro

112.24 Scraped wheels - cog rattles
 Ratchet

112.3 Split idiophones - Instruments in the shape of two springy arms connected at one end and touching at the other: the arms are forced apart by a little stick, to jangle or vibrate on recoil.

Plucked idiophones (12)
Instruments set into vibration by plucking. Lamellophones.

In the form of a frame (121)

121.1 Clack idiophones - The lamella is carved in the surface of a fruit shell, which serves as resonator.
 Cricri

121.2 Guimbardes and Jaw harps - The lamella is mounted in a rod- or plaque-shaped frame and depends on the player's mouth cavity for resonance.

121.21 Idioglot guimbardes - The lamella is of one substance with the frame of the instrument.
Đàn môi
Genggong
Gogona
Kubing
Mukkuri

121.22 Heteroglot guimbardes - The lamella is attached to the frame.

121.221 Individual heteroglot guimbardes.
 Jew's harp
 Morsing
 Temir komuz

121.222 Sets of heteroglot guimbardes.
 Kouxian

In the form of a comb (122)
The lamellae are tied to a board or cut out from a board like the teeth of a comb.

122.1 With laced on lamellae.
 Array mbira
 Agidigbo
 Ikembe (Eleke, Kisanji)
 Kalimba (thumb piano)
 Kasayi
 Marímbula
 Mbira (Sansa, Sanza, Kaffir piano, Likembe)
 Malimbe
 Mechanical music box
 Oopoochawa
 Space Harp (electric thumb piano, Frankiphone)
 Tom
 Zimbabwean Marimba

122.11 Without resonator.

122.12 With resonator.

122.2 With cut-out lamellae
Comb
Mechanical music box

Friction idiophones (13)
Instruments set into vibration by rubbing.

Friction sticks (131)
131.1 Individual friction sticks.

131.2 Sets of friction sticks.
 Nail violin

131.21 Without direct friction.

131.22 With direct friction.

Friction plaques (132)
132.1 Individual friction plaques.
 Daxophone
 Musical saw

132.2 Sets of friction plaques.
 Marimbaphone

Friction vessels (133)
133.1 Individual friction vessels.

133.2 Sets of friction vessels.
 Glass harmonica (hydrodaktulopsychicharmonica)
 Glass harp
 Singing bowl
 Verrophone

Blown idiophones (14)
Instruments set into vibration by blowing or moving air.

Blown sticks (141)
141.1 Individual blown sticks.

141.2 Sets of blown sticks.
 Aeolsklavier
 Aeolodion

Blown plaques (142)
142.1 Individual blown plaques.

142.2 Sets of blown plaques.

Unclassified idiophones (15)
Idiophones not allocated a number in the Hornbostel-Sachs system.
Wobble board, a directly flexed idiophone
Waterphone, an arrangement of rods around a central resonating bowl, played by bowing, shaking, or percussively  using sticks or mallets with Superballs on the end

External links
 "Idiophone", Virginia Tech Multimedia Music Dictionary.
 "Musical Instruments: Chapter Three, Idiophones", Rudolf Rasch: My Work on the Internet, Part Three. 
 "SVH Classification", Virtual Instrument Museum.
Ethnomusicology Collection of Idiophones - University of Washington Library

Lists of musical instruments by Hornbostel–Sachs number
Lists of percussion instruments